The dusky leaftosser (Sclerurus obscurior) is a tropical American bird species in the ovenbird family Furnariidae. It is also known as the South American leaftosser.

Systematics

Subspecies

 Sclerurus obscurior obscurior (or S. obscurior obscurior) Hartert, 1901 – Highlands from Isthmus of Panama (Cerro Malí, Cerro Pirre, Cerro Tacarcuna) through Cordillera Occidental of Colombia to El Oro and W Loja provinces in SW Ecuador. S. m. anomalus, described from Cerro Sapo (Panama), is not recognizably distinct; presumably it belongs to obscurior
Darker and less rufous than mexicanus.
 Sclerurus obscurior peruvianus (or Sclerurus obscurior peruvianus) Chubb, 1919 – Cordillera Oriental south from W Meta Department – perhaps from as far north as Santander Department – (Colombia), adjacent Amazonas basin (Amazonas, Acre N Rondônia states in NW Brazil), to E Peru and NW Santa Cruz Department (Bolivia).
Generally like obscurior, but even less rufous.
 Sclerurus obscurior andinus Chapman, 1914 – Lowlands of Panamá Province (E Panama) to N Colombia, perhaps including Santander Department; from there northeast to the Serranía del Perijá of Venezuela, and southeast through S Venezuela to the Gran Sabana and W Guyana.
Lighter than mexicanus, rump and uppertail coverts very rufous.
 Sclerurus obscurior macconnelli Chubb, 1919 – Guianas, Rio Negro and Tapajós E to Maranhão, S to N Mato Grosso states (Brazil).
Similar to mexicanus, but more olive-brown; rufous on throat and rump very pronounced, extending onto chest.
 Sclerurus obscurior bahiae (or Sclerurus bahiae) Chubb, 1919 – Atlantic Forest of Brazil, from Alagoas to NE São Paulo.
Similar to pullus; rump rich rufous-brown, throat dark and contrasting little with breast.

Range and ecology
The dusky leaftosser ranges from eastern Panama to eastern Brazil.

Footnotes

dusky leaftosser
Birds of Central America
Birds of Colombia
Birds of Ecuador
Birds of the Guianas
Birds of the Amazon Basin
Birds of the Atlantic Forest
dusky leaftosser
dusky leaftosser
Birds of Brazil